Sprung is an American crime comedy television series created by Greg Garcia. It premiered on the streaming service Amazon Freevee on August 19, 2022.

Synopsis
After spending nearly three decades in prison, Jack is released and has to figure out where he will now live. His determination not to reenter a life of crime is challenged when his former cellmate Rooster offers a room at his mother Barb's house, with the stipulation that Jack join their criminal enterprise.

Cast

Main
 Garret Dillahunt as Jack
 Shakira Barrera as Gloria
 Phillip Garcia as Rooster
 Clare Gillies as Wiggles
 James Earl as Melvin
 Martha Plimpton as Barb

Guest
 Kate Walsh as Congresswoman Paula Tackleberry
 Susan Ruttan as Lorraine
 David Wells as Herb
 Fred Grandy as Horace Tackleberry
 Camden Garcia as Collin
 Andre Jamal Kinney as Brett
 Chris Bauer as Stan
 Mark Christopher Lawrence
 Mike Rob
 Steven Ogg as Spike

Episodes

Season 1 (2022)

Production

Casting
On April 28, 2021, it was announced that IMDb TV (later renamed Amazon Freevee) gave a series greenlight to Sprung, a single-camera comedy created by Greg Garcia and starring Garret Dillahunt, Illeana Douglas, and Phillip Garcia. On September 1, 2021, it was reported that Douglas would be replaced by Martha Plimpton. Garcia, Dillahunt, and Plimpton previously worked together on the sitcom Raising Hope. On May 2, 2022, it was reported that Kate Walsh, Camden Garcia, and Andre Jamal Kinney had joined the cast. The series also stars Shakira Barrera, James Earl, and Clare Gillies, and guest stars Chris Bauer, Mark Christopher Lawrence, Mike Rob, Fred Grandy, Steven Ogg, Susan Ruttan, and David Wells.

Filming
The sitcom was filmed throughout the Pittsburgh area in the summer and fall of 2021. Greg Garcia wrote and directed all nine episodes. The series is set in 2020, in the early days of the Covid-19 pandemic.

Release
The trailer was released on July 7, 2022. The first two episodes of the series premiered on Amazon Freevee on August 19, 2022, and then two episodes will be released weekly, with the season finale on September 15, 2022.

References

2022 American television series debuts
2020s American comedy television series
Television shows about the COVID-19 pandemic
Television series by 3 Arts Entertainment
Television series by Amazon Studios